Real Pests is a 1977 Slovenian comedy film by the writer and director Jože Bevc, starring  Bert Sotlar, Dare Valič and Majda Potokar. The film was one of the most successful films in Slovenia, holding the domestic box office record for almost 15 years.

Plot 
Real Pests is a light-hearted comedy about a widower Štebe (Bert Sotlar), who works as a bus driver and lives with his five adolescent sons and an elderly maid Rozi (Majda Potokar) in Ljubljana. The boys are wild, constantly playing pranks on neighbors and Rozi, who is fed up with their behavior which earned them the nickname "gadi" ("pests", or literally "vipers"). One day, she fulfills her threat and leaves for home in the countryside despite being extremely fond of the family. Right then, Rozi's young niece Meri (Milada Kalezič) comes to town and is offered a place to stay by Štebe until she can find a job. The attractive Meri cannot compete with Rozi at housekeeping, but she immediately wraps all the boys around her finger, also getting attention from Štef's coworker Toni (Boris Cavazza) with whom she later becomes a couple. However, nobody seems to know where she is going every afternoon. Finally, Štebe, who knows Rozi very well, convinces her to come back. At the same time, the mystery about Meri is also solved: she had been learning to drive a bus and has just passed the driving test, becoming a driver at the city transport company. Everybody boards her bus and they drive off.

Cast 
 Bert Sotlar - father Štebe
 Dare Valič - Bine
 Majda Potokar - Rozi
 Jože Horvat - Brane
 Milada Kalezič - Meri
 Boris Cavazza - Toni
 Radko Polič - Boris
 Andrej Prevc - Janez
 Bogdan Sajovic - Muki

References

External links 
 

1977 films
1977 comedy films
Films set in Ljubljana
Yugoslav comedy films
Slovenian comedy films
Films set in Yugoslavia
Slovene-language films